Halsway Manor (also known as Halsway Court) is a manor house in Halsway, Somerset. It is owned by the Halsway Manor Society who operate the manor as a national centre for the folk arts. It is the only residential folk centre in the UK. It is situated off the A358 road between Taunton and Williton on the edge of the Quantock Hills.

Buildings

Halsway manor was held in 1086 by Roger de Courcelles with Alric, the owner in 1066, as his tenant. The manor passed through many owners down to 1965 and these are listed in the Victoria County History for Somerset, Volume 5.

The eastern end of the building dates from the fifteenth century; the western end is a nineteenth-century addition. The manor house, which is mentioned in the Domesday Book, is claimed to have been built by Cardinal Beaufort as a hunting lodge. At one point it was occupied by insurrectionist Jack Cade. Thereafter it was a family home until the mid-1960s, when it became the folk music centre. It has been designated by English Heritage as a grade II* listed building. There is a ballroom, library and lounge bar with an impressive entrance hall. The latter has oak panelling and staircase, with an open fireplace and barrel ceiling. The mews is now used for accommodation.

In 1859, John Henry Parker wrote in his Account of Domestic Architecture:

Folk Centre
Halsway Manor Society Ltd was registered as a charity on 8 March 1966 to promote participation in the folk arts — traditional folk music, dance, song, storytelling, folklore and related arts and crafts — through a year-round programme of residential courses, classes, events and activities for people of all ages and abilities. Participants come from all over the country and abroad. Local people are encouraged to get involved through regular dance and music clubs, concerts, an annual festival, fete and craft fairs.

References

External links
Halsway Manor website

Grade II* listed buildings in West Somerset
English folk music
Music in Somerset
Country houses in Somerset
Grade II* listed houses in Somerset